Kristy Whelchel Hartofilis (born June 15, 1977) is an American former professional soccer player. As a defender, she represented the New York Power of Women's United Soccer Association (WUSA), as well as Fortuna Hjørring of the Danish Elitedivisionen.

Club career
After graduating from Duke University in 1999, Whelchel accepted an offer to play for Fortuna Hjørring in Denmark. In only her fourth game for the club she damaged ankle ligaments and returned to the United States. Whelchel played for USL W-League team Raleigh Wings in 1999 and 2000. She was the New York Power's third round draft pick (20th overall) for the inaugural 2001 season of the Women's United Soccer Association (WUSA).

In the league's first season, Whelchel started all 21 of the Power's regular season matches and scored two goals. She started 20 of the team's 21 games in 2002, serving one assist. Before the 2003 season she suffered an anterior cruciate ligament injury but recovered to start three of her five appearances. When WUSA subsequently folded, she began working as a real estate agent in Manhattan.

International career
From 1995 until 1998 Whelchel was part of the United States women's national under-21 team. She participated in three editions of the Nordic Cup.

Personal life
Kristy's mother Susan Whelchel is a former Mayor of Boca Raton, Florida. In 2010 Kristy and her brother Jay Whelchel launched Whelchel Partners Real Estate Services in Boca Raton. While living in New York she met her husband, Nick Hartofils. The couple have two daughters and a son.

References

External links
 Profile at Women's United Soccer Association
 Profile at New York Power
 Profile at Duke University Athletics

1977 births
Living people
American expatriate women's soccer players
Soccer players from Florida
Fortuna Hjørring players
Women's association football defenders
New York Power players
American women's soccer players
Duke Blue Devils women's soccer players
Expatriate women's footballers in Denmark
Women's United Soccer Association players
USL W-League (1995–2015) players
American real estate brokers
Raleigh Wings players